A shark net is a submerged net placed around beaches to reduce shark attacks on swimmers. 

Shark net may also refer to:

 The Shark Net, a memoir by Robert Drewe
The Shark Net, TV mini-series produced by Sue Taylor